The Catechism of Saint Pius X is the name commonly used to designate a 1908 book titled Catechismo della Dottrina Cristiana (Catechism of the Christian doctrine), issued at the order of Pope Pius X with questions and answers regarding the essentials of Catholic faith. A shortened version was published in 1930 with the addition of illustration.

Characteristics
Saint Pius X intended a Catechism that all Catholics could relate to and understand. Issued at the beginning of the twentieth century in Italian, Catechismo della dottrina Cristiana, Pubblicato per Ordine del Sommo Pontifice San Pio X deals in less than 50 pages with all questions of faith and morality in a simple but comprehensive form. The Catechism begins with a listing of the most important prayers of the Catholic Church. The book has only three parts, Faith, the Ten Commandments and Grace.

English editions
Pius X's original catechism was first translated in English by Msgr. John Hagan, Vice-Rector of the Irish College in Rome, in 1910.

Modern English printings of the Catechism of Saint Pius X are typically sourced from a 1974 translation by Rev. Msgr. Eugene Kevane. Additionally, Kevane's edition is directly translated from the Italian catechism Catechismo della Dottrina Cristiana, a 1953 abridgement of Pius X's original version. Kevane's version also possessed additional changes to the text to adapt it "according to the Second Vatican Council", resulting in further alterations to Pius X's work.

As such, modern English printings omit parts of the original text, including Pius X's writings on the existence of the Limbo of the Infants.

Sophia Institute Press's Tradivox Vol. 8 reprints the original unaltered 1910 English translation by Hagan.

Recent developments

Second Vatican Council

Following the Second Council of the Vatican, the Catechism of Saint Pius X fell into disuse. The Dutch Catechism of 1966, authored by theologians Edward Schillebeeckx  and Piet Schoonenberg  was proposed as a successor to it, but was met by strong opposition by conservative sectors of the Church due to its perceived Modernism. The debate ended with the promulgation of the 1992 Catechism of the Catholic Church by Pope John Paul II. Despite this, the Catechism of Saint Pius X, alongside the 1566 Roman Catechism, is still widely used by Traditionalist Catholics.

Pope Benedict XVI

Joseph Cardinal Ratzinger, when discussing the forthcoming Compendium of the Catechism of the Catholic Church, referred to the catechism of Saint Pius X:  "The faith, as such, is always the same. Therefore, St. Pius X's catechism always retains its value […] There can be persons or groups that feel more comfortable with St. Pius X's catechism. [...] [T]hat Catechism stemmed from a text that was prepared by the Pope himself [Pius X] when he was Bishop of Mantua. The text was the fruit of the personal catechetical experience of Giuseppe Sarto [Pius X], whose characteristics were simplicity of exposition and depth of content. Also because of this, St. Pius X's catechism might have friends in the future".

Marital obligations
The succinctness the Catechism is exemplified in the enumeration of the obligations of married persons.Q. Which are the principal obligations of married persons? A. Married persons should: (1) Guard inviolably their conjugal fidelity and behave always and in all things as Christians; (2) Love one another, be patient with one another, and live in peace and concord; (3) Think seriously of providing for their children, if they have any, according to their needs; bring them up as Christians, and leave them free to choose the state of life to which they are called by God.

References

External links 

 The Catechism of St. Pius X

1908 non-fiction books
1908 in Christianity
Catechisms of the Catholic Church
Pope Pius X